Tanna Marie Frederick (born August 11, 1977) is a stage and independent film actress who rose to prominence for her title role in Henry Jaglom's Hollywood Dreams, for which she received the Best Actress Award at the 2008 Fargo Film Festival.

Biography
Tanna Frederick was born in Mason City, Iowa.

Education 
She attended school in Mason City, and by fourth grade had begun to play in productions of that town's Stebens' Children's Theatre. Following her graduation from Mason City High School in 1995, Tanna Frederick attended college at the University of Iowa where she double majored in theater and political science. She was a regular on Iowa City stages appearing at the Riverside Theatre as "Jill" in Jack and Jill, and at the University Theatre in a one-woman play that she had written herself and titled Questioning Jabe.

Frederick graduated in 1999 as valedictorian of her University of Iowa liberal arts class, and shortly thereafter moved to Los Angeles to follow what the actress has termed her "Joan of Arc calling" which happened at the age of 7.

Career of actress 
After graduation Tanna Frederick received irregular assignments as an extra on Days of Our Lives, and as an actress in several stage productions including N. Richard Nash's Echoes and Ben Guillory and Danny Glover's production of Toussaint: For the Love of Freedom. Between assignments, she did whatever was necessary to "pay the bills," including work as a waitress.

At one of the rehearsals for Toussaint, a fellow actor mentioned that he had just played a part in a Henry Jaglom film. At the time Frederick had not heard of Jaglom, but following the colleague's suggestion that "supposedly, if you write him a letter and tell him that you love his films, he'll cast you in a movie," Frederick wrote to Jaglom. In a three-page letter she extolled the virtues of Jaglom's film Déjà Vu — even though she had not actually seen it at the time. To her surprise, Jaglom called her back and invited her to a screening, and soon thereafter gave her a job at his office.

In 2002, Jaglom gave Frederick his play A Safe Place (a theatrical version of his 1972 debut film of the same name), suggesting that she tackle it with her acting class. Frederick then went one step further and found a theater company who would produce it. The play opened in September 2003 and ran for three months. That same year Frederick also received her first film assignment, in Helen Lesnick's Inescapable (released 2003).

According to Madeleine Shaner in Back Stage West, Frederick's success with A Safe Place inspired Jaglom to also adapt his 1985 screenplay Always (But Not Forever) to the stage. And her "talent gave Jaglom the impetus to switch the lead characters in the play from a wife who was trying to leave her husband, to a husband who wanted out of his marriage." The play, in which Frederick plays the scorned wife "Dina," subsequently opened in October 2005 as Always... But Not Forever.

In Fall 2006, Frederick began work on Jaglom's Hollywood Dreams, a mildly satirical view of the deceptions of the film industry. In the film Frederick plays the lead role of "Margie Chizek," a young woman from Mason City, Iowa, who is desperate to break into the film business. The film debuted at the American Film Institute's November 2006 Festival to good reviews, which increased following the film's theatrical release in May 2007. The New York Times observed that Hollywood Dreams was "driven by Ms. Frederick's no-boundaries commitment to her broken character," and that she gave "a performance that [was as] startling as it [was] touching." Her performance as "Margie" also gained her the Best Actress Award at the 2007 Montana Independent Film Festival and the Best Actress Award at the 2008 Fargo Film Festival.

In late 2006, Frederick helped found the Iowa Independent Film Festival to encourage students and local artists to "make great art right in their own backyards" and to "tap into the inspiration that [comes from the event]." According to the festival's website, over sixty films had been submitted for inclusion in the second festival of April 2008.

In mid-2007, Frederick began work on new editions of Jaglom's 1985 film Always (But Not Forever). In both the stage version (directed by Gary Imhoff) and the screen version (this time directed by Ron Vignone) Frederick plays Jaglom's original character, which Jaglom rewrote for her. The play opened in October 2007 as Always – But Not Forever.

In October 2009, Henry Jaglom's new play "Just 45 Minutes From Broadway" opened at the Edgemar Center for the Arts in Santa Monica with Frederick in the lead role. There were over 100 performances of the play, which ended its run August 1, 2010.

In October 2012, Jaglom's film version of Just 45 Minutes From Broadway opened, with Frederick recreating her role of Pandora Isaacs.  In 2014, Frederick was chosen to perform in the National Black Theatre Festival for her role on stage as Lula in Amiri Baraka's 'The Dutchman' while concurrently starring in Jaglom's 'Train to Zakopane' at the Edgemar Center for the Arts.

Frederick starred in Danny and the Deep Blue Sea directed by Carl Weathers in 2017 which was an LA Critic's Pick. She also produced and starred in "Two Ways Home" which garnered her several awards on the 2019 festival circuit including Best Actress and Women's Empowerment Award, as well as an endorsement from the film by NAMI (National Alliance on Mental Health) for its storyline involving a character overcoming stigma associated with bi-polar disorder.

Tanna is a practitioner of Taekwondo having earned her 4th Dan Black Belt.

Filmography
2003 Inescapable 
2003 First Impressions
2006 Charles at the Threshold
2006 Hollywood Dreams
2007 Rising Shores
2009 Irene in Time
2010 Queen of the Lot
2010 Shrek Forever After - VO the Dragon
2011 Virtually Yours
2012 Just 45 Minutes from Broadway
2014 December. 17th
2014 The 'M' Word
2014 A Lasting Impression
2015 Ovation
2018 South of Hope Street
2019 Two Ways Home

Stage
2003 A Safe Place
2007 Always — But Not Forever
2009/2010 Just 45 Minutes from Broadway
2011 Sylvia
2011 Jack and Jill
2012/2013 The Rainmaker
2014/2015 Train to Zakopane, The Dutchman
2018 Danny and the Deep Blue Sea

Marathons
Frederick has participated in several marathons including the ASICS, LA Marathon in 2015.

References

Bibliography

 .
 .
 .
 .
 
 .
 .
 .
 .
 Toto, Christian (July 14, 2009) WWTW Interview Tanna Frederick ("Irene in Time")

External links 
 Official Website

Actresses from Iowa
American film actresses
American stage actresses
University of Iowa alumni
People from Mason City, Iowa
1977 births
Living people
21st-century American women